Jiang Cuihua (born 2 February 1975) is a former Chinese cyclist. She competed in the track time trial at the 2000 Summer Olympics where she won a bronze medal.

References

1975 births
Living people
Chinese female cyclists
Olympic cyclists of China
Cyclists at the 2000 Summer Olympics
Asian Games medalists in cycling
Cyclists at the 1998 Asian Games
Medalists at the 2000 Summer Olympics
Olympic bronze medalists for China
Sportspeople from Dalian
Cyclists from Liaoning
Medalists at the 1998 Asian Games
Asian Games silver medalists for China
Olympic medalists in cycling
21st-century Chinese women